Carlos Ernesto Ayala Amaya (born December 23, 1982) is a Salvadoran professional footballer.

Club career
Ayala started his career at Second Division side Coca-Cola, later renamed as Independiente Nacional 1906. He made his debut in the Premier Division with Chalatenango and joined Alianza in 2009.

International career
Ayala received his first call up to the El Salvador national football team in December 2008, after impressing head coach Carlos de los Cobos during the Apertura 2008 season where he finished as the league's leading scorer.

He officially received his first cap on January 22, 2009 in a UNCAF Nations Cup game against Nicaragua. He scored his first goal on January 24, 2009 in a UNCAF Nations Cup game against Belize.

International goals
Scores and results list El Salvador's goal tally first.

References

External links

  
  
 

1982 births
Living people
People from San Salvador Department
Association football forwards
Salvadoran footballers
El Salvador international footballers
C.D. Chalatenango footballers
Alianza F.C. footballers
C.D. Luis Ángel Firpo footballers
2009 UNCAF Nations Cup players